The Essentials is a compilation album by American musician Jack Johnson. The album features 18 of Johnson's greatest hits over eight of his albums. The album was released only in Japan on July 4, 2018 on CD and for digital download. The album also features Mike D's "Big Sur" remix as the lead single.

Track listing

Chart performance 
The album debuted at number 68 on the Japanese Albums Chart and has remained on the chart for seven weeks.

Charts

Release history

References 

2018 greatest hits albums
Jack Johnson (musician) albums
Brushfire Records compilation albums
Albums produced by Mario Caldato Jr.
Albums produced by Zach Gill
Albums produced by Robert Carranza